Antero Tukiainen (26 February 1916 – 14 May 1996) was a Finnish rower. He competed in the men's coxed four event at the 1952 Summer Olympics.

References

External links
 

1916 births
1996 deaths
People from Porvoo
People from Uusimaa Province (Grand Duchy of Finland)
Finnish male rowers
Olympic rowers of Finland
Rowers at the 1952 Summer Olympics
Sportspeople from Uusimaa